The 56th Ariel Awards ceremony, organized by the Mexican Academy of Film Arts and Sciences (AMACC) took place in 2014, in Mexico City. During the ceremony, AMACC presented the Ariel Award in 23 categories honoring films released in 2013. La Jaula de Oro received nine awards out of 14 nominations, including Best Picture and Best Actor for Brandon López. Amat Escalante won the accolade for Best Director. Other multiple awarded films included Cinco de Mayo: La Batalla and Ciudadano Buelna with two awards.

Awards
Winners are listed first and highlighted with boldface

Multiple nominations and awards

The following sixteen films received multiple nominations:

Films that received multiple awards:

References

Ariel Awards ceremonies
2014 film awards
2014 in Mexican cinema